Akmal Saleh ( Coptic: Ⲁⲕⲙⲁⲗ Ⲥⲁⲗⲉϩ) (born 21 July 1964) is an Egyptian-Australian comedian and actor. He was born in Egypt and arrived in Sydney with his family in 1975 at the age of 11. He has been performing comedy since the early 1990s and his live shows have toured comedy festivals both within Australia and internationally. He has also made guest appearances on numerous Australian television series such as Superwog.

Background
Born in Egypt, Saleh moved to Sydney in 1975 at the age of 11. While his father Riyadh, a university professor, was fluent in English, neither Saleh nor his mother Marie could speak the language when they arrived. He grew up in Punchbowl, New South Wales and describes himself as having been a quiet child who was "the class clown's assistant. I was the guy who got his props ready." He grew up in a "very right-wing fundamentalist Christian family", which he says contributed to his sense of humour.  "My father... was a very witty man with a quick mind. My mother was neurotic and mad. I think the combination of those two turned me into who I am," he says.

Saleh was 14 when his father died of a disease contracted years earlier when swimming in the Nile River. Searching for something meaningful in his life, Saleh became very religious and joined the Coptic Orthodox Christian church. However, within a few years he says he grew resentful of the religion, finding it "corrupt and hypocritical". Saleh says that when he discovered comedy it "filled the void that religion left", and his disillusionment with Christianity became a subject of comedy in his stand-up routine from early on. Saleh now describes himself as an agnostic.

He began performing stand-up comedy in 1990, when he decided to take part in an Open Mic night at the Sydney Comedy Store. Prior to this, he started a number of university degrees and drove a taxi. Saleh is married; his wife, Cate, is a social worker. He has said that they do not intend to have children, a decision he says which is probably influenced by his father's untimely death.

Career
Saleh entered into stand-up comedy in 1990. For a time, he performed under the alias "Peter Saleh"—"so that people would think I was white", he says. "'Peter' seemed like a common name. 'Akmal' is such an awkward name, a very difficult name to remember." In 1992 he co-wrote and starred in the show All Aussies are Boofta and also the best alongside fellow comedians Anthony Mir and Gary Eck, which enjoyed successful runs in various Sydney venues. This was followed by the live shows Bound And Gagged and Hoot, the latter of which toured the 1996 Adelaide Fringe Festival, the Melbourne International Comedy Festival, and the Edinburgh Festival Fringe. In 1999 the trio created the television show The Fifty-Foot Foot Show for Australia's The Comedy Channel. Saleh was credited onscreen by his real name; he says he had not bothered to use his stage name because he did not expect that many people would watch an obscure cable television show. "But strangely enough, enough people saw it and saw me in the street and said, 'Hey Akmal, good show mate! Loved The Fifty-Foot Show.'''"  He says he found it so much nicer to be called by his real name, and has performed under it ever since. Saleh has also collaborated with Mir and Eck on the 2002 film You Can't Stop The Murders, which he co-wrote and starred in.

Saleh also performs solo stand-up shows and has toured numerous comedy festivals in both in Australia and internationally. He commonly jokes about his own ethnicity and negative stereotypes regarding Middle Easterners. However, he says that he does not want to become known as an "ethnic comic" and likes to be able to talk about  "broad range of stuff". He says that he is most comfortable performing stand-up: "It's the thing that I do best. I'm not a radio guy. I'm a comedian doing radio."

Saleh emerged on Australian radio in January 2007, filling in for Merrick and Rosso on Nova for three weeks during the summer before receiving his own drive-time show. He was initially contracted to co-host the show alongside actor Matthew Newton, but Newton was unexpectedly dropped after news emerged that he was facing assault charges involving a former girlfriend and instead Saleh made a solo debut. The show has since experienced several changes of co-hosts Saleh co-hosted the drive shift with comedians Cal Wilson and Ed Kavalee.

Saleh has appeared on numerous Australian television shows, such as I'm a Celebrity...Get Me Out of Here!, Hey Hey it's Saturday, Rove Live, The Footy Show (rugby league), The Glass House, In Siberia Tonight, Thank God You're Here, Big Questions, Hughesy, We Have a Problem, Spicks and Specks, Tracey McBean and is a regular panel member in Good News Week.

In 2013, Akmal Saleh became an ambassador for the Top Blokes Foundation. Saleh currently lives in Queanbeyan as of 2013.

Filmography
Films

Television

Video games

Discography
Video albums

Awards and nominations
ARIA Music Awards
The ARIA Music Awards are a set of annual ceremonies presented by Australian Recording Industry Association (ARIA), which recognise excellence, innovation, and achievement across all genres of the music of Australia. They commenced in 1987. 

! 
|-
| 2008 || Akmal Live and Uncensored || rowspan="2"| ARIA Award for Best Comedy Release ||  || rowspan="2"| 
|-
| 2018 || Transparent'' ||  
|-

Notes

External links

1964 births
Living people
Australian people of Egyptian descent
Australian stand-up comedians
Australian agnostics
Australian former Christians
Australian people of Coptic descent
Egyptian emigrants to Australia
People from New South Wales
Nova (radio network) announcers
I'm a Celebrity...Get Me Out of Here! (Australian TV series) participants
Blinky Bill